The so-called Mask of la Roche-Cotard, also known as the "Mousterian Protofigurine", is a purported artifact dated to around 75,000 years ago, in the Mousterian period. It was found in 1975 in the entrance of a cave named La Roche-Cotard, territory of the commune of Langeais (Indre-et-Loire), on the banks of the river Loire.

The artifact, possibly created by Neanderthal humans, is a piece of flat flint that has been shaped in a way that seems to resemble the upper part of a face.  A piece of bone pushed through a hole in the stone has been interpreted as a representation of eyes. Paul Bahn has suggested this "mask" is "highly inconvenient", as "It makes a nonsense of the view that clueless Neanderthals could only copy their cultural superiors the Cro-Magnons". Though this may represent an example of artistic expression in Neanderthal humans, some archaeologists question whether the artifact represents a face, and some suggest that it may be practical rather than artistic.

See also
Art of the Upper Paleolithic
Art of the Middle Paleolithic
List of Stone Age art

References

Further reading
M. Lorblanchet, La naissance de l'Art. Genèse de l'art préhistorique, Errances, 1999
Marquet J.-C., M. Lorblanchet, Le "Masque" moustérien de La Roche-Cotard, Langeais (Indre-et-Loire). Paléo, 2000, n° 12, p. 325-338.
Laurence Nicoud: L'art néandertalien: réalité et énigme. Archéologia (Paris): 407:6, January 2004
The Mousterian Protofigurine from La Roche-Cotard (France)

1975 archaeological discoveries
Archaeology of France
Archaeological artifacts
Neanderthals
Prehistoric art in France
Masks in Europe
Indre-et-Loire
Mousterian